Painters Run is a  long 1st order tributary to Buffalo Creek in Brooke County, West Virginia.

Variant names
According to the Palmer's Farm Map of Brooke County, WV in 1914 this stream was also known by:.
Panther Run

Course
Painters Run rises about 1.5 miles west of Fowlerstown, West Virginia, and then flows southwest to join Buffalo Creek at Marshall Terrace.

Watershed
Painters Run drains  of area, receives about 40.0 in/year of precipitation, has a wetness index of 287.70, and is about 71% forested.

See also
List of rivers of West Virginia

References

Rivers of West Virginia
Rivers of Brooke County, West Virginia